The 1872 United States presidential election was the 22nd quadrennial presidential election, held on Tuesday, November 5, 1872. Despite a split in the Republican Party, incumbent President Ulysses S. Grant defeated Democratic-endorsed Liberal Republican nominee Horace Greeley.

Grant was unanimously re-nominated at the 1872 Republican National Convention, but his intra-party opponents organized the Liberal Republican Party and held their own convention. The 1872 Liberal Republican convention nominated Greeley, a New York newspaper publisher, and wrote a platform calling for civil service reform and an end to Reconstruction. Democratic Party leaders believed that their only hope of defeating Grant was to unite around Greeley, and the 1872 Democratic National Convention nominated the Liberal Republican ticket.

Despite the union between the Liberal Republicans and Democrats, Greeley proved to be an ineffective campaigner and Grant remained widely popular. Grant decisively won re-election, carrying 31 of the 37 states, including several Southern states that would not again vote Republican until the 20th century. Grant would be the last incumbent to win a second consecutive term until William McKinley's victory in the 1900 presidential election, and his popular vote margin of 11.8% was the largest margin between 1856 and 1904.

On November 29, 1872, after the popular vote was counted, but before the Electoral College cast its votes, Greeley died. As a result, electors previously committed to Greeley voted for four candidates for president and eight candidates for vice president. The election of 1872 also remains the only instance in U.S. history in which a major presidential candidate died during the election process. This election set the record for the longest Republican popular vote win streak in American history, four elections, a record that would be matched by the same party in 1908. However, Grant is one of only four Republican Presidents to have served two full terms in office, the others being Dwight D. Eisenhower, Ronald Reagan, and George W. Bush.

Nominations

Republican Party nomination 

At the convention the Republicans nominated President Ulysses S. Grant for re-election, but nominated Senator Henry Wilson from Massachusetts for vice president instead of the incumbent Schuyler Colfax, although both were implicated in the Credit Mobilier scandal which erupted two months after the Republican convention. Others, who had grown weary of the corruption of the Grant administration, bolted to form the Liberal Republican Party.

The opposition fusion nominations 
In the hope of defeating Grant, the Democratic Party endorsed the nominees of the Liberal Republican Party.

Liberal Republican Party nomination 

An influential group of dissident Republicans split from the party to form the Liberal Republican Party in 1870. At the party's only national convention, held in Cincinnati in 1872, New York Tribune editor and former representative Horace Greeley was nominated for president on the sixth ballot, defeating Charles Francis Adams. Missouri Governor Benjamin Gratz Brown was nominated for vice president on the second ballot.

Democratic Party nomination 

The Convention met in Baltimore, Maryland, on July 9–10. Because of its strong desire to defeat Ulysses S. Grant, the Democratic Party also nominated the Liberal Republicans' Greeley/Brown ticket and adopted their platform. Greeley received 686 of the 732 delegate votes cast, while Brown received 713. Accepting the Liberal platform meant the Democrats had accepted the New Departure strategy, which rejected the anti-Reconstruction platform of 1868. They realized that to win the election they had to look forward, and not try to re-fight the Civil War. They also realized that they would only split the anti-Grant vote if they nominated a candidate other than Greeley. However, Greeley's long reputation as the most aggressive antagonist of the Democratic Party, its principles, its leadership, and its activists, cooled Democrats' enthusiasm for the presidential nominee.

Some Democrats were worried that backing Greeley would effectively bring the party to extinction, much like how the moribund Whig Party had been doomed by endorsing the Know Nothing candidacy of Millard Fillmore in 1856, though others felt that the Democrats were in a much stronger position on a regional level than the Whigs had been at the time of their demise, and predicted (correctly, as it turned out) that the Liberal Republicans would not be viable in the long-term due to their lack of distinctive positions compared to the main Republican Party. A sizable minority led by James A. Bayard sought to act independently of the Liberal Republican ticket, but the bulk of the party agreed to endorse Greeley's candidacy. The convention, which lasted only six hours stretched over two days, is the shortest major political party convention in history.

The Liberal Republican Party fused with the Democratic Party in all states except for Louisiana and Texas. In states where Republicans were stronger, the Liberal Republicans fielded a majority of the joint slate of candidates for lower offices; while in states where Democrats were stronger, the Democrats fielded the most candidates. In many states, such as Ohio, each party nominated half of a joint slate of candidates. Even initially reluctant Democratic leaders like Thomas F. Bayard came to support Greeley.

Other nominations 

Presidential Candidates:

Labor Reform Party 
The Labor Reform Party had only been organized in 1870 at the National Labor Union Convention, which organized the Labor Reform Party in anticipation of its participation in the 1872 presidential election. In the lead-up to the 1872 presidential election, state-level affiliates of the party formed and saw limited success. One of its major victories was forming a majority coalition with the Democratic Party in the New Hampshire House of Representatives in 1871 in which William Gove, one of its members, was elected Speaker of the House.

The party's first National Convention meeting was held in Columbus, Ohio, on February 22, 1872. Initially, there was a fair amount of discussion as to whether the party should actually nominate anyone for the presidency at that time, or if they should wait at least for the Liberal Republicans to nominate their own ticket first. Every motion to that effect lost, and a number of ballots were taken that resulted in the nomination of David Davis for president, who was the frontrunner for the Liberal Republican presidential nomination at that time. Joel Parker, the Governor of New Jersey, was nominated for vice president.

While Davis did not decline the presidential nomination of the Labor Reform party, he decided to hinge his campaign in large part on the success of attaining the Liberal Republican presidential nomination, so that he might at least have their resources behind him. After their convention, in which he failed to attain their presidential nomination, Davis telegraphed the Labor Reform party and informed them of his intention to withdraw from the presidential contest entirely. Joel Parker soon followed suit.

A second convention was called on August 22 in Philadelphia, where it was decided, rather than making the same mistake again, that the party would cooperate with the new Straight-Out Democratic Party that had recently formed. After the election, the various state affiliates grew less and less active, and by the following year, the party ceased to exist. Labor Reform party activity continued to 1878, when the Greenback and Labor Reform parties, with other organizations, formed a National Party.

Straight-Out Democratic Party 
Unwilling to support the Democratic party ticket (Greeley/Brown), a group of mostly Southern Democrats held what they called a Straight-Out Democratic Party convention in Louisville, Kentucky, on August 11, 1872. They nominated as presidential candidate Charles O'Conor, who declined their nomination by telegram; for vice president they nominated John Quincy Adams II. Without time to choose a substitute, the party ran the two candidates anyway. They received 0.36% of the popular votes, and no Electoral College votes.

Equal Rights Party 
Victoria Woodhull is recognized as the first woman to run for president. She was nominated for president by the small Equal Rights Party.  Frederick Douglass was nominated for vice president, although he did not attend the convention, acknowledge his nomination, or take an active role in the campaign.

General election

Campaign 
Grant's administration and his Radical Republican supporters had been widely accused of corruption, and the Liberal Republicans demanded civil service reform and an end to the Reconstruction process, including withdrawal of federal troops from the South. Both Liberal Republicans and Democrats were disappointed in their candidate Greeley. As wits asked, "Why turn out a knave just to replace him with a fool?" A poor campaigner with little political experience, Greeley's career as a newspaper editor gave his opponents a long history of eccentric public positions to attack. With memories of his victories in the Civil War to run on, Grant was unassailable. Grant also had a large campaign budget to work with. One historian was quoted saying, "Never before was a candidate placed under such great obligation to men of wealth as was Grant." A large portion of Grant's campaign funds came from entrepreneurs, including Jay Cooke, Cornelius Vanderbilt, Alexander Turney Stewart, Henry Hilton, and John Astor.

Women's suffrage 
This was the first election after the formation of the National Woman Suffrage Association and the American Woman Suffrage Association in 1869. As a result, protests for women's suffrage became more prevalent. The National Woman's Suffrage Association held its annual convention in New York City on May 9, 1872. Some of the delegates supported Victoria Woodhull, who had spent the year since the previous NWSA annual meeting touring the New York City environs and giving speeches on why women should be allowed to vote. The delegates selected Victoria Woodhull to run for president, and named Frederick Douglass for vice- president. He did not attend the convention and never acknowledged the nomination, though he would serve as a presidential elector in the United States Electoral College for the State of New York. Woodhull gave a series of speeches around New York City during the campaign. Her finances were very thin, and when she borrowed money from supporters, she often was unable to repay them. On the day before the election, Woodhull was arrested for "publishing an obscene newspaper" and so was unable to cast a vote for herself. Woodhull was ineligible to be president on Inauguration Day, not because she was a woman (the Constitution and the law were silent on the issue), but because she would not reach the constitutionally prescribed minimum age of 35 until September 23, 1873; historians have debated whether to consider her activities a true election campaign. Woodhull and Douglass are not listed in "Election results" below, as the ticket received a negligible percentage of the popular vote and no electoral votes. In addition, several suffragists would attempt to vote in the election. Susan B. Anthony was arrested when she tried to vote and was fined $100 in a widely publicized trial.

Results 

Grant won an easy re-election over Greeley, with a popular vote margin of 11.8% and 763,000 votes.

Grant also won the electoral college with 286 electoral votes; while Greeley won 66 electoral votes, he died on November 29, 1872, twenty-four days after the election and before any of his pledged electors (from Texas, Missouri, Kentucky, Tennessee, Georgia, and Maryland) could cast their votes. Subsequently, 63 of Greeley's electors cast their votes for other Democrats: 18 of them cast their presidential votes for Greeley's running mate, Benjamin Gratz Brown, and 45 cast their presidential votes for three non-candidates.

Of the 2,171 counties making returns, Grant won in 1,335 while Greeley carried 833. Three counties were split evenly between Grant and Greeley.

Disputed votes 
During the joint session of Congress for the counting of the electoral vote on February 12, 1873, five states had objections that were raised regarding their results. However, unlike the objections which would be made in 1877, these did not affect the outcome of the election.

This election was the last in which Arkansas voted for a Republican until 1972, and the last in which it voted against the Democrats until 1968. Alabama and Mississippi would not be carried by a Republican again until 1964, and they would not vote against the Democrats until 1948. North Carolina and Virginia would not vote Republican again until 1928. West Virginia, Delaware and New Jersey would not vote Republican again until 1896.

Table of results 

Source (popular vote): Dave Leip's Atlas of U.S. Presidential Elections Retrieved on November 3, 2022

Source (electoral vote): 

(a) These candidates received votes from Electors who were pledged to Horace Greeley, who died before the electoral votes were cast.
(b) Brown's vice-presidential votes were counted, but the presidential votes for Horace Greeley were rejected since he was ineligible for the office of President due to his death.
(c) See Breakdown by ticket below.
(d) The 14 electoral votes from Arkansas and Louisiana were rejected. Had they not been rejected, Grant would have received 300 electoral votes out of a total of 366, well in excess of the 184 required to win, and he would have became the first candidate to receive over 300 electoral votes.

Source:

Geography of results

Cartographic gallery

Results by state 
Source: Data from Walter Dean Burnham, Presidential ballots, 1836–1892 (Johns Hopkins University Press, 1955) pp 247–57.

Close states 
Red font color denotes states won by Republican Ulysses S. Grant; pink denotes those won by Democrat/Liberal Republican Horace Greeley.

States where the margin of victory was under 1% (19 electoral votes)
Maryland 0.69% (927 votes)
Virginia 0.98% (1,816 votes)

Margin of victory between 1% and 5% (32 electoral votes)
Delaware 4.23% (924 votes)
Tennessee 4.32% (7,736 votes)
Arkansas 4.35% (3,446 votes)
West Virginia 4.46% (2,788 votes)
Connecticut 4.81% (4,619 votes)

Margin of victory between 5% and 10% (133 electoral votes):
Kentucky 5.87% (11,229 votes)
Alabama 6.38% (10,828 votes)
Indiana 6.41% (22,515 votes)
New York 6.46% (53,456 votes)
Florida 7.04% (2,336 votes)
Ohio 7.09% (37,531 votes) (tipping point state with rejection of electors in Arkansas and Louisiana)
New Hampshire 8.33% (5,743 votes) (tipping point state if electors of Arkansas and Louisiana were not rejected)
New Jersey 9.04% (15,200 votes)
Wisconsin 9.16% (18,517 votes)
Georgia 9.94% (13,806 votes)

Breakdown by ticket 

(a) The used sources had insufficient data to determine the pairings of 4 electoral votes in Missouri; therefore, the possible tickets are listed with the minimum and maximum possible number of electoral votes each.
(b) Brown's vice-presidential votes were counted, but the presidential votes for Horace Greeley were rejected since he was ineligible for the office of President due to his death.

Demise of the Liberal Republicans 

Though the national party organization disappeared after 1872, several Liberal Republican members continued to serve in Congress after the 1872 elections. Most Liberal Republican Congressmen eventually joined the Democratic Party. Outside of the South, some Liberal Republicans sought the creation of a new party opposed to Republicans, but Democrats were unwilling to abandon their old party affiliation and even relatively successful efforts like Wisconsin's Reform Party collapsed. Even the strong Missouri Liberal Republican Party collapsed as the Democrats re-established themselves as the major opposition party to the Republicans. In the following years, former Liberal Republicans became members in good standing of both major parties.

See also 
 1872–73 United States Senate elections
 1872–73 United States House of Representatives elections
 American election campaigns in the 19th century
 History of the United States (1865–1918)
 Presidency of Ulysses S. Grant
 Reconstruction era
 Second inauguration of Ulysses S. Grant
 Third Party System

Notes

References

Further reading 

 Donald, David Herbert. Charles Sumner and the Rights of Man (1970).
 Downey, Matthew T. "Horace Greeley and the Politicians: The Liberal Republican Convention in 1872," The Journal of American History, Vol. 53, No. 4. (Mar. 1967), pp. 727–750. in JSTOR
  online edition

 Gerber, Richard Allan. "The Liberal Republicans of 1872 in historiographical perspective." Journal of American History 62.1 (1975): 40-73. online

 Lunde, Erik S. "The Ambiguity of the National Idea: the Presidential Campaign of 1872" Canadian Review of Studies in Nationalism 1978 5(1): 1-23. .
 McPherson, James M. "Grant or Greeley? The Abolitionist Dilemma in the Election of 1872" American Historical Review 1965 71(1): 43–61. online

 Prymak, Andrew. "The 1868 and 1872 Elections," in Edward O. Frantz, ed. A Companion to the Reconstruction Presidents 1865–1881 (Wiley Blackwell Companions to American History) (2014) pp. 235–56 online
 Republican Campaign Clubs, Horace Greeley Unmasked. New York: Republican Campaign Clubs, 1872. —Campaign pamphlet.
 Rhodes, James Ford. History of the United States from the Compromise of 1850 to the McKinley-Bryan Campaign of 1896. Volume: 7 ch 39–40.  (1920)

 
 Slap, Andrew L. The Doom of Reconstruction: The Liberal Republicans in the Civil War Era (2006) online

 Strauss, Dafnah. "Ideological closure in newspaper political language during the US 1872 election campaign." Journal of Historical Pragmatics 15.2 (2014): 255–291. DOI: 10.1075/jhp.15.2.06str online
 Summers, Mark Wahlgren. The Press Gang: Newspapers and Politics, 1865–1878 (1994) ch 15
 Summers, Mark Wahlgren. The Era of Good Stealings (1993), covers corruption 1868–1877
 Van Deusen, Glyndon G. Horace Greeley, Nineteenth-Century Crusader (1953) online edition

Primary sources 
 American Annual Cyclopedia...for 1872 (1873), comprehensive collection of facts online edition
   online edition
 Chester, Edward W A guide to political platforms (1977) online
 Porter, Kirk H. and Donald Bruce Johnson, eds. National party platforms, 1840-1964 (1965) online 1840-1956

External links 

 Presidential Election of 1872: A Resource Guide from the Library of Congress
 1872 popular vote by counties
 Election of 1872 in Counting the Votes 

 
Presidency of Ulysses S. Grant
Ulysses S. Grant
November 1872 events